Idelesaurus is a genus of dicynodont from the Late Permian (Wuchiapingian) Ilinskoe Subassemblage of the Sokolki Assemblage Zone of Russia.

References 

Dicynodonts
Lopingian synapsids of Europe
Fossils of Russia
Fossil taxa described in 2006
Anomodont genera